Quezon Boulevard is a short stretch of highway in Manila, Philippines running north–south through the district of Quiapo. It is a six- to ten-lane  divided boulevard designated as a component of National Route 170 (N170) of the Philippine highway network, except for its service roads, and Radial Road 8 (R-8) of Manila's arterial road network which links the center of Manila to North Luzon Expressway in Quezon City in the north. The boulevard is the main access to the popular Quiapo Church and is one of the main thoroughfares of the University Belt area.

History
The origin of the boulevard could be traced back to two parallel streets, Calle Santa Rosa and Calle Concepcion, that terminated at Estero de Quiapo, as well as the old sections of Calle Norzagaray and Calle Globo de Oro at the south. In the early 1900s, Calle Santa Rosa and Calle Concepcion were renamed to Calle Regidor (after La Solidaridad writer Antonio Maria Regidor) and Calle Martin Ocampo (after El Renacimiento and La Vanguardia editor Martin Ocampo), respectively. Calle Martin Ocampo was also known as Calle El Dorado circa 1920. 

Quezon Boulevard was developed as part of a national road plan to connect the government center of Manila in Rizal Park to the proposed new capital on the Diliman estate. Named after the then-President of the Commonwealth, Manuel Luis Quezon, it was built in 1939 over Calle Regidor and the western portion of Calle Norzagaray, which were widened by demolishing all the buildings and houses on its east side and eventually combined with Calle Martin Ocampo and a portion of Calle Globo de Oro. It was also in 1939 when the old Puente Colgante, which connected the boulevard south over the Pasig River to Padre Burgos Avenue in Ermita, was replaced by the modern steel arch bridge, Quezon Bridge. According to a 1945 map published by the United States Army Map Service, it was also known as Quezon Avenue. Its northern extension is now called España Boulevard and Quezon Avenue, respectively.

Route description

Quezon Boulevard begins on Carlos Palanca Sr. Street (formerly Calle Echague), by the riverside Quinta Market, as a continuation of Padre Burgos Avenue from Ermita and Intramuros from Quezon Bridge. It intersects with Arlegui Street, which leads to San Miguel district and the Malacañang Palace complex, and Hidalgo Street (former Calle San Sebastian) which leads to San Sebastian Church, before arriving at Plaza Miranda and Quiapo Church, site of the annual Feast of the Black Nazarene. The boulevard then runs into a junction with Gonzalo Puyat Street (former Calle Raon), which cuts through the commercial area of Quiapo towards Santa Cruz, and heads for Sampaloc district at the intersection with Recto Avenue. It ends at the junction with Lerma Street where it continues as Alfonso Mendoza Street (formerly Calle Andalucía), which heads north to the San Lazaro Tourism and Business Park.

Intersections

Landmarks

From north to south:
 Manila City Jail
 Far Eastern University
 Isetann Cinerama Recto
 QQ Mall
 Sun Star Grand Hotel
 Raon Shopping Center
 Manila branch of Ma Mon Luk
 Quiapo Church
 Plaza Miranda
 Quinta Market

See also
 List of roads in Metro Manila

References

Streets in Manila
Boulevards
Quiapo, Manila